The women's individual competition at the Biathlon World Championships 2019 was held on 12 March 2019.

Results
The race was started at 15:30.

References

Women's individual